Abdoulaye Fall (born 18 May 1989) is a Senegalese professional footballer who plays as a central midfielder.

Club career
Born in Dakar, Fall joined S.L. Benfica's youth setup in October 2007, after a successful trial, from local US Gorée. On 9 March of the following year he was selected on the bench for the Primeira Liga match against União de Leiria, but remained unused in the 2–2 home draw.

In August 2008 Fall moved to La Vitréenne FC in France's CFA. After appearing regularly for the side he signed a two-year deal with Servette FC on 7 July 2011. After failing to gain a work permit, he moved to Spain and joined CD Badajoz in Segunda División B.

Fall appeared in 23 matches (21 starts, 1980 minutes of action) and scored two goals during the campaign, as his side were eventually relegated. On 27 July 2012 he signed for Cádiz CF, also in the third level, after a trial period.

Fall was an ever-present figure for the Yellow Submarine, and signed a new four-year deal on 21 February 2013. On 29 January of the following year he was loaned to SK Sigma Olomouc until June.

Fall played his first match as a professional on 22 February, starting in a 5–1 home routing over SK Slavia Prague for the Czech First League championship; he contributed with three further appearances (all starts) before returning to Cádiz in June. On 13 August he rescinded with the latter, and moved to fellow league team Real Balompédica Linense.

References

External links
 
 
 
 

1989 births
Living people
Footballers from Dakar
Senegalese footballers
Association football midfielders
US Gorée players
S.L. Benfica footballers
Championnat National 2 players
La Vitréenne FC players
Segunda División B players
CD Badajoz players
Cádiz CF players
Real Balompédica Linense footballers
UCAM Murcia CF players
CD Alcoyano footballers
Extremadura UD footballers
UE Cornellà players
SCR Peña Deportiva players
Lleida Esportiu footballers
Czech First League players
SK Sigma Olomouc players
Nejmeh SC players
Lebanese Premier League players
Senegalese expatriate footballers
Senegalese expatriate sportspeople in Portugal
Senegalese expatriate sportspeople in France
Senegalese expatriate sportspeople in Spain
Senegalese expatriate sportspeople in the Czech Republic
Senegalese expatriate sportspeople in Lebanon
Expatriate footballers in Portugal
Expatriate footballers in France
Expatriate footballers in Spain
Expatriate footballers in the Czech Republic
Expatriate footballers in Lebanon